Atlas Comics may refer to

 Atlas Comics (1950s), one of the two comic publishing companies that would be the forerunner of Marvel Comics
 Seaboard Periodicals, founded by Timely/Atlas (1950s)/Marvel founder, a short-lived comic publisher that published under the Atlas Comics name and referred to as Atlas/Seaboard Comics

See also
Atlas (disambiguation)#Arts, entertainment, and media